Muzafar Bhutto (August 23, 1970 – May 22, 2012; Sindhi: مظفر ڀٽو) was a Sindhi nationalist politician, who served as the Secretary General of the Jeay Sindh Muttahida Mahaz (JSMM). His body was found at a roadside near Hatri bypass, in Hyderabad, Pakistan after he went missing on 25 February 2011. Following his death, JSMM members resorted to heavy aerial firing in different areas of Sindh. The heavy aerial firing created fear and panic among the people in Sindh and forced many business to close down.

Early life and education
Muzafar Bhutto was born in Sehwan, Jamshoro, Sindh. Bhutto was a graduate of the Mehran University of Engineering Technology and worked at the Power House, Jamshoro but was removed from service following his first disappearance in 2005. Muzafar Bhutto was married to Saima Bhutto and had two sons and one daughter.

Political career
He started his political career by joining separatists terrorist organisations, JSMM, which was led by Shafi Burfat. The organisation was responsible for being involved in attacks on railway tracks in Sindh.

Death
Muzafar Bhutto was kidnapped on 25 February 2011 from national highway near Saeedabad town. His dead body was later found stuffed in a gunny bag near Bukhari village in Hyderabad.

Following his death, JSMM members resorted to aerial firing in different areas of Sindh which in turn forced business to close down. JSMM members aerial firing also injured many people with one of the injured having been reported to have succumbed to his injuries.

See also
G M Syed
List of kidnappings
List of solved missing person cases
List of unsolved murders

References

1970 births
2010s missing person cases
2012 deaths
Formerly missing people
Kidnapped people
Male murder victims
Missing person cases in Pakistan
People from Jamshoro District
Unsolved murders in Pakistan